Nadine Andrina Riesen (born April 11, 2000) is a Swiss footballer who plays as a defender for FC Zürich and for the Switzerland national team.

Career

Clubs 
Nadine Riesen grew up in Niederteufen. She started playing football at FC Bühler at the age of 9 and won two junior cups (2014 and 2015). In 2015 she moved to FC St. Gallen and made it straight into the first team. She made her debut in the top Swiss league on August 15, 2015, in a game against Yverdon-Sport. Riesen was in the starting lineup and was substituted in the 69th minute. The team was relegated to Nationalliga B at the end of the season. In 2017, FC St. Gallen merged with FC Staad to form FC St. Gallen-Staad. In 2019, Riesen moved to Bern for two seasons to join the BSC Young Boys and thus back into the Women's Super League. In 2021, she was voted into Team of the Season (the so-called Golden Eleven). In 2021 she moved to FC Zürich, with whom she won the double in her first season. She also played in Women's Champions League qualifiers for the first time that season.

National Team 
Riesen went through all the junior selections of the Swiss Football Association. In 2018 she took part in the U-19 European Championship. She played in all three games, but the Swiss team was eliminated after the preliminary round. On June 14, 2019, at age 19, she made her senior debut for the Swiss national team in an international match against Serbia. Due to an injury to Ella Touon, she was called up for the squad for the 2022 European Championship. In the second game against Sweden, she made a partial appearance.

Achievements 

 Swiss Champions: 2022 with FC Zürich
 Swiss Cup: 2022 with FC Zürich

External links 

 Nadine Riesen in the weltfussball.de database
 Nadine Riesen in the soccerdonna.de database

References 

Swiss women's footballers
Living people
2000 births
FC Zürich Frauen players
BSC YB Frauen players
Association football defenders
Women's association football defenders
Switzerland women's international footballers
Switzerland youth international footballers